Galaxy 4 may refer to:

Technology
 Samsung Galaxy S4, an Android smartphone produced by Samsung
 Samsung Galaxy Tab S4, an Android tablet produced by Samsung
 Galaxy IV, a satellite belonging to Intelsat's Galaxy fleet

Other uses
 Galaxy 4, the first serial of the third season in the British science fiction television series Doctor Who